Maritime Museum ferry wharf is located on the southern side of the Brisbane River serving the Brisbane suburb of South Brisbane in Queensland, Australia. It is served by RiverCity Ferries' CityHopper service. It was originally named River Plaza.

The wharf sustained major damage during the January 2011 Brisbane floods. A new wharf was built opening on 31 July 2011, with the Maritime Museum name adopted after the adjacent Queensland Maritime Museum.

References

External links

Ferry wharves in Brisbane
South Brisbane, Queensland